Lee Seung-hyeop (born 15 April 1971) is a South Korean footballer. He is played for Pohang Steelers. He was also part of the  South Korea squad at the 1992 Olympics tournament.

References

External links
 
 

1971 births
Living people
South Korean footballers
South Korea international footballers
Pohang Steelers players
K League 1 players
Olympic footballers of South Korea
Footballers at the 1992 Summer Olympics
Place of birth missing (living people)
Association football defenders